"A Place to Stay" is a song written by Torben Hedlund. Performed by Jenny Silver in the first semifinal of Melodifestivalen 2010 in Örnsköldsvik, the song didn't make it further.

Chart positions

References 

2010 singles
Jenny Silver songs
Melodifestivalen songs of 2010
2010 songs